Jussi Pekka Hakulinen (21 December 1964 – 9 August 2022) was a Finnish musician and singer-songwriter. He was one of the original members of the group Yö, one of the best-selling rock bands in Finland. Hakulinen left the band for solo career in 1985 after two platinum selling albums. Since 1990, Hakulinen was an occasional visitor to Yö's concerts and also wrote material for the band. His songs Joutsenlaulu (1984) and Rakkaus on lumivalkoinen (2003), recorded by Yö, have been voted as the greatest Finnish pop songs in several listeners polls.

Discography

Yö 
Varietee (1983)
Nuorallatanssija (1984)

Kinsky 
Valtaa ja voimaa (1986)

Solo 
Vaaleanpunainen majatalo (1985)
Pennitön Onassis (1991)
Vieraskirja (1995)
3.33.33 (1998)
Tähtipölyä (2010)

References

External links

 
 

1964 births
2022 deaths
People from Pori
Finnish male singer-songwriters
Finnish rock musicians
20th-century Finnish singers
20th-century Finnish male singers
21st-century Finnish singers
21st-century Finnish male singers